The FEI World Cup Jumping 2009/2010 was the 32nd edition of the premier international show jumping competition run by the FEI. The final was held at the Palexpo in Le Grand-Saconnex near Geneva, Switzerland from April 14, 2010 to April 18, 2010. Meredith Michaels-Beerbaum of Germany was the defending champion, having won the final the previous year (2008/09) in Las Vegas, Nevada, United States.

The champion of the World Cup Final of this year is Marcus Ehning, also of Germany.

Arab League

Caucasian League

Central Asian League

Central European League

North Sub-League

South Sub-League

Final

Japan League

North American League

East Coast
Events of the former North American League (United States East Coast) and the East Coast events of the former North American League (Canada) are now part of the North American League - East Coast.

West Coast
Events of the former Mexican League, the former North American League (United States West Coast) and the West Coast events of the former North American League (Canada) are now part of the North American League - West Coast.

Pacific League

Australia

New Zealand

South African League

South American League

South East Asia League

Western European League

World Cup Final

References

 show jumping result search of the International Federation of Equestrian Sports

External links
Official website
Complete event schedule

2009 in show jumping
2010 in show jumping
2009 2010